The Bohemian Citizens' Benevolent Society is a private benevolent society founded in 1892 in Astoria, Queens to support Czech and Slovak immigrants to the area, as well as people of Czech and Slovak ancestry. The Society is commonly known as "Bohemian Hall", for the historic structure (NRHP) in which it is located.

Description
The founders of the organization said that the purpose of the society is to encourage, support, and maintain Bohemian schools, dramatics, and libraries for Czech children and children of Czech heritage; to maintain a non-profit-making home social for Czechs and people of Czech ancestry in which the Czech culture may be taught and blended with American traditions and culture which makes the people better Americans. The organization has an annual revenue of $1,000,000 and employs a staff of approximately 14. The current president of the organization is Alan Svoboda.

Bohemian Hall and Beer Garden

The Bohemian Hall and Beer Garden has a big indoor and outdoor bar complex. The bar complex can hold 800 people and is open year-round. Food that the bar serves is Czech specialties. There is a linden tree that was planted by Václav Havel. There are old signs and flags from the Czech Republic inside the bar. There are beers from the Czech Republic and Slovakia like Golden Pheasant, BrouCzech, Pilsner Urquell, Krušovice, Czechvar, and Staropramen. Most of the workers speak Czech and English. Most of the regular people that are there are middle-aged and elderly immigrants. The Hall hosts holiday parties, ethnic festivals, local jazz groups, Czech rock bands, and touring acts. The Bohemian Hall hosts the annual Czech and Slovak festival. The hall also has a Sokol club and a Czech school. The Bohemian Hall keeps the people linked, visually and materially, to the past.

Closure
Revenue was so low in the early 1990s that the hall threatened to close. A large group of people, not all Czech, started a "Save the Hall" meeting. Václav Havel, the former president of Czechoslovakia, was so moved by the outcome of the meeting that when he stopped by in 2000 he stayed for hours and held a conference.

References

External links

 

Buildings and structures on the National Register of Historic Places in New York City
Neoclassical architecture in New York City
Buildings and structures completed in 1910
Buildings and structures in Queens, New York
Clubs and societies in the United States
Friendly societies
Czech-American culture in New York City
Sokol in the United States
Slovak-American culture in New York (state)
Astoria, Queens
Ethnic fraternal orders in the United States
Beer gardens in the United States
National Register of Historic Places in Queens, New York
Beer in New York City